This is a list of prisons within the Ningxia region of the People's Republic of China.

Sources 

Buildings and structures in Ningxia
Ningxia